Mater Dei High School is a private, Catholic, co-educational secondary school in Santa Ana, California. It is located in the Roman Catholic Diocese of Orange.  Mater Dei is known for its strong sports programs, especially in football, and for its multiple graduates who have won the Heisman Trophy. As of 2022, the school has had 23 Gatorade Players of the Year. The Football team plays in the Southern Section Division 1, and most recently won the CIF State Championship during the 2021 season. There is a total of 25 sports teams at the school, with 71% of the athletes being on the Honor Roll.

Controversy 
The school has received mixed attention in local media due in part to their method of scouting athletes from public high schools in due process of offering scholarships as a part of recruitment for their acclaimed football program.

In 2021, a lawsuit was filed alleging that systemic hazing pervaded the football program resulting in a "brutal locker room altercation."  Another 2021 lawsuit alleged that two Mater Dei football players severely injured a classmate in an orchestrated attack.  Orange County bishop Kevin Vann responded with a public statement supporting the school's leadership and criticizing the "media frenzy".  The school announced it would commission an independent investigation into the allegations.

In January 2022, a female alumna of Mater Dei filed a lawsuit following the surfacing accusations of hazing, alleging that she was sexually assaulted by a former football coach during the late 1980s.

Sports
Mater Dei High School’s mascot are The Monarchs. They currently support over 15 Men’s sport teams and 15 women sport teams:
Baseball(Varsity,JV,Freshman)
Basketball(Varsity,JV,Freshman)
Cross-Country(Varsity,JV)
Dance Team(JV, Freshman)
Football(Varsity,JV,Freshman)
Golf(Varsity,JV)
Ice Hockey(Varsity)
Lacrosse(Varsity,JV)
Soccer(Varsity,JV,Freshman)
Swimming(Varsity)
Tennis(Varsity,JV)
Track & Field(Varsity,JV,Freshman)
Volleyball (Varsity,JV,Freshman)
Water Polo (Varsity,JV,Freshman)
Wrestling (Varsity,JV)

Notable alumni

Athletics

 Matt Barkley – NFL quarterback
 McQuin Baron – Olympic Water Polo Player
 Colt Brennan – NFL quarterback
 Bol Bol – NBA Center
 Schea Cotton – basketball player
 JT Daniels – college football quarterback for the  West Virginia Mountaineers
 Thomas Duarte – NFL tight end
 LeRon Ellis – NBA power forward and center
 Danny Espinosa – MLB second baseman
 Austin Faoliu – NFL defensive tackle
 Spencer Freedman – college basketball player for the Harvard Crimson
 Reggie Geary – NBA guard
 Tiki Ghosn – Mixed martial arts fighter
 Matt Grootegoed – NFL linebacker
 Mike Hessman – Major League Baseball player
 Vince Hizon – American-born former Philippine Basketball Association player
 Khaled Holmes – NFL center
 Mike Hopkins – NCAA basketball player and coach
 John Huarte – Heisman Trophy winner and NFL quarterback
 Sara Hughes – professional beach volleyball player
 Chris Jackson – NFL wide receiver
 Stanley Johnson – NBA forward
 Taylor King – professional basketball player
 Tyler Lamb – professional basketball player
 Matt Leinart – Heisman Trophy winner and NFL quarterback
 Todd Marinovich – NFL Quarterback
 Ryan McMahon – MLB player
 Bobby Meacham – MLB shortstop and coach
 Daniel Meyer – Major League Baseball player
 Kaleena Mosqueda-Lewis – WNBA guard
 Katin Reinhardt – professional basketball player
 Robbie Rogers – MLS winger
 Jamal Sampson – NBA forward-center
 Katie Lou Samuelson – guard/forward in the WNBA
 Sergio Santos – MLB relief pitcher
 Miles Simon – basketball analyst for ESPN and former NBA guard
 Anthony Slama – MLB relief pitcher 
 Olive Sagapolu – USFL Defensive Tackle
 Amon-Ra St. Brown – NFL wide receiver
 Ryan Stonehouse – American football punter, NCAA record holder
 D. J. Strawberry – NBA point guard
 Matt Treanor – MLB catcher
 Michael Wang – NCAA basketball player
 David Wear – NCAA basketball forward
 Travis Wear – NBA basketball forward
 Larry Williams – NFL football player
 Max Wittek – former NCAA football quarterback
 Greg Woepse – silver medalist at the 1979 Pan Am Games in the pole vault
 Bryce Young – Heisman Trophy winner and college football quarterback for the Alabama Crimson Tide

Other
 John A. Davis – film director/animator
 Mike Gallagher (2002) – United States Congressman from Wisconsin's 8th congressional district (2017–present)
 Bob Gunton – actor
 Ashley Hartman – actress
 Jeff Lewis – real estate agent and investor
 Steve Oedekerk – film actor, comedian, director, film editor, film producer, and screenwriter
 Aimee Phan – author
 Mike Pniewski – actor, speaker
 Jaime Soto – Bishop of the Diocese of Sacramento
 Victory Tischler-Blue – singer, film producer, director, photographer, and member of the all-female band The Runaways
 Jennifer Warnes – singer, songwriter, arranger, and record producer
 Juan Zarate (1989) – Assistant Secretary of the Treasury (2001–2005) and Deputy National Security Advisor for Combating Terrorism (2005–2009)
 Shelby Rabara – actress, voice over actress, and dancer

References

External links 

 

Roman Catholic Diocese of Orange
Catholic secondary schools in California
High schools in Santa Ana, California
Educational institutions established in 1950
1950 establishments in California